Olginsky (masculine), Olginskaya (feminine), or Olginskoye (neuter) is the name of several rural localities in Russia:
Olginsky (rural locality), a khutor in Voskresensky Rural Okrug of Abinsky District of Krasnodar Krai
Olginskoye, Republic of Bashkortostan, a village in Kaltovsky Selsoviet of Iglinsky District of the Republic of Bashkortostan
Olginskoye, Republic of North Ossetia–Alania, a selo in Olginsky Rural Okrug of Pravoberezhny District of the Republic of North Ossetia–Alania
Olginskaya, Krasnodar Krai, a stanitsa in Olginsky Rural Okrug of Primorsko-Akhtarsky District of Krasnodar Krai
Olginskaya, Rostov Oblast, a stanitsa in Olginskoye Rural Settlement of Aksaysky District of Rostov Oblast